Lisa Brueggemann (born ) was a German female artistic gymnast, representing her nation at international competitions.

She participated at the 2004 Summer Olympics.  She also competed at world championships, including the 2001 World Artistic Gymnastics Championships in Ghent, Belgium.

References

External links
http://www.gymmedia.com/artistic-gymnastics/All-Olympic-Gymnasts-arrived-Athens
http://www.gymnasticsresults.com/2000/e2000w.html
http://www.kostiskal.net/madme/meleurb.html
http://www.gettyimages.com/photos/dtb-pokal?excludenudity=true&sort=mostpopular&mediatype=photography&phrase=dtb%20pokal
https://www.youtube.com/watch?v=FdJnCnacfkY

1984 births
Living people
German female artistic gymnasts
Place of birth missing (living people)
Gymnasts at the 2004 Summer Olympics
Olympic gymnasts of Germany